Under My Skin may refer to:

In music

Albums 
 Under My Skin (Avril Lavigne album), 2004
 Under My Skin (Gabrielle album), 2018
 Under My Skin (Play album), 2010
 Under My Skin (Stephen Pearcy album)

Songs 
 "Under My Skin" (Blue System song), 1988
 "Under My Skin" (Sarah Connor song), 2008
 "Under My Skin" (Deborah Conway song), 1991
 "Under My Skin" (Winterville song)
 Under My Skin, a song by Aerosmith from Just Push Play
 "Under My Skin", a song by Gin Wigmore
 "Under My Skin", a song by Rachael Yamagata from Happenstance
 "Under My Skin", a song by Mudvayne from L.D. 50

Television
 "Under My Skin" (House), an episode of the TV series
 List of Elementary episodes#ep69

Other
 Under My Skin (book), a 1994 volume of Doris Lessing's autobiography
 Under My Skin (1950 film), a film starring John Garfield
 Under My Skin (2020 film), an Australian-American drama film

See also
 "I've Got You Under My Skin", a 1936 song written by Cole Porter
 Under the Skin (disambiguation)